Corrado Paina (born in Milan in 1954) is an Italian-born poet based in Toronto.

His writing reflects the changes of borders in life, sex and soul. His works have been published in Canada and Italy.

Bibliography

Poetry collections published 

Hoarse Legend, 2000
The Dowry of Education, 2004
The Alphabet of the Traveler, 2006
Souls in Plain Clothes, 2008
Cinematic Taxi, 2015
Largo Italia
L'alfabeto del Viaggiatore
A Toast to Illness

Short story collections 

 Di Corsa (Monteleone/Mapograph – Vibo Valentia) 
 Tempo Rubato (Atelier 14 – Milano) 
 Darsena Inquinata (Moderata Durant – Latina)

Novels 

 Tra Rothko e Tre Finestre" (Ibiskos) 
 Abecedario (etchings by Sandro Martini)
 Between Rothko and three windows

Plaquettes 

 "Il Pulcino e L'elefante" of Alberto Casiraghi, 
 "i Quaderni d'Orfeo" of Roberto Dossi and Luciano Ragozzino 
 "Il Ragazzo Innocuo" of Dario Borso

Editor 

College Street – Little Italy – The Renaissance Strip (Mansfield Press) finalist of the Toronto Heritage Award

References 

1954 births
20th-century Canadian poets
Canadian male poets
Italian poets
Living people
Italian male poets
20th-century Canadian male writers